Subinermexocentrus allardi is a species of beetle in the family Cerambycidae, and the only species in the genus Subinermexocentrus. It was described by Stephan von Breuning in 1972.

References

Apomecynini
Beetles described in 1972
Monotypic beetle genera